Quentin David Jean Pierre Danloux (born 16 November 2001) is a French footballer who plays as a midfielder for Colombian club Patriotas Boyacá.

Career
Born in Bordeaux, Danloux moved to Spain at the age of three and played the most of his youth career for Elche CF. In 2019, after a year at Kelme CF, he signed for Tercera División side Novelda CF. 
 
In 2020, Danloux signed for Patriotas Boyacá in Colombia, becoming the first Frenchman in the league's history.

References

External links
 
 

Living people
2001 births
French footballers
Association football midfielders
Patriotas Boyacá footballers
French expatriate footballers
French expatriate sportspeople in Spain
French expatriate sportspeople in Colombia
Expatriate footballers in Spain
Expatriate footballers in Colombia